Durst is a surname of German origin (meaning thirst), and may refer to:

 Cedric Durst (1896–1971), American outfielder in Major League Baseball
 Douglas Durst (born 1944), American businessman, New York real estate investor, and developer
 Fred Durst (born 1970), American singer from American metal band Limp Bizkit
 Hans-Peter Durst (born 1958), German para cyclist
 Joseph Durst (1882–1974), American real estate developer
 Kathryn Durst, Canadian artist
 Matthias Durst (1815–1875), Austrian violinist and composer
 Mose Durst (born 1939), American  author, educator, and former national president of the Unification Church
 Nora Durst, a character in The Leftovers TV series
 Richard Durst (born 1945), American educator, president of Baldwin-Wallace College in Berea, Ohio
 Robert Durst (1943–2022), American businessman, millionaire, and convicted murderer
 Seymour Durst (1913–1995), American inventor of the National Debt Clock
 Stephanie Durst (born 1982), American sprinter
 Will Durst (born 1952), American political satirist

See also
Dorst (surname)

Surnames of German origin